Theoni “Thenia” Zerva (born 18 July 1997), also known as Thenia Zervas, is a Greek footballer who plays as a defender or a winger for US college team Louisiana–Monroe Warhawks and the Greece women's national team.

Early life
Zerva was born in Athens and raised in Kalamata.

College career
Zerva has attended the Monroe Community College, the Lincoln Memorial University and the University of Louisiana at Monroe in the United States.

Club career
Zerva has played for Kalamata 91, Eleusina, Glyfada, Ergotelis and PAOK in Greece and for the Rochester Lady Lancers in the United States.

International career
Zerva capped for Greece at senior level during two UEFA Women's Euro qualifyings (2017 and 2022).

References

1997 births
Living people
Footballers from Kalamata
Greek women's footballers
Women's association football defenders
Women's association football wingers
PAOK FC (women) players

Monroe Community College alumni
College women's soccer players in the United States
Lincoln Memorial Railsplitters women's soccer players
Louisiana–Monroe Warhawks women's soccer players
Greece women's international footballers
Greek expatriate women's footballers
Greek expatriate sportspeople in the United States
Expatriate women's soccer players in the United States